Brett Youngberg (born September 15, 1979 in White Rock, British Columbia) is a male volleyball player from Canada, who competed for the Men's National Team as a middle/centre hitter. He was a member of the national squad who ended up in seventh place at the 2007 Pan American Games in Rio de Janeiro, Brazil.

References
Canada Olympic Committee

1979 births
Living people
Canadian men's volleyball players
Stanford University alumni
Sportspeople from British Columbia
Volleyball players at the 2007 Pan American Games
Pan American Games competitors for Canada